West Elgin Secondary School is a secondary school, located at 139 Graham Street in West Lorne, Ontario. It serves the rural area of West Elgin, including West Lorne, Rodney, Dutton/Dunwich, Wallacetown and Iona Station. WESS is part of the Thames Valley District School Board.

See also
List of high schools in Ontario

References

External links

High schools in Elgin County
Educational institutions established in 1952
1952 establishments in Ontario